José María Rodríguez de la Borbolla Camoyán (born 16 April 1947) is a Spanish politician and lawyer, member of the Spanish Socialist Workers' Party of Andalusia, who was President of Andalusia between 1984 and 1990.

Legacy
In 2021 he donated his personal archive to the Fundación Centro de Estudios Andaluces for its digitalization.

References

1947 births
Leaders of political parties in Spain
Living people
Spanish Socialist Workers' Party politicians
Presidents of the Regional Government of Andalusia
Seville city councillors
Members of the 1st Parliament of Andalusia
Members of the 2nd Parliament of Andalusia